Oliver White (born September 17, 1994) is a Jamaican American footballer who last played as a forward for Cabinteely in the League of Ireland First Division.

Career 

The 2012 Massachusetts Gatorade Player of the Year played 4 years of varsity soccer for Harvard University before signing for FC Boston in their inaugural USL League Two season. In December 2016, White signed for FC Bulleen Lions of the National Premier Leagues Victoria. In January 2018 White transferred from FC Bulleen to Kingston City FC. In March of 2019 White signed for Memphis 901 FC of the USL Championship. On July 1, 2019, White was loaned to USL League One club Forward Madison FC for the remainder of the 2019 season. White signed for League of Ireland First Division outfit Cabinteely on March 1 2020, scoring on his debut in the League of Ireland Cup First Round.

On July 11th, 2020 White launched The Oliver White Foundation
, a charitable organization with the goals of amplifying black excellence, donating monthly to programs that help uplift the Black community, and fundraising through sales of soccer jerseys that commemorate the life of black people shot by law enforcement officers. 

As of October 2020, White appears to have retired from professional soccer; according to his Instagram page.

Career statistics
Professional appearances – correct as of 11 March 2020.

References

External links
Profile at Harvard University

1994 births
Living people
American soccer players
American people of Jamaican descent
Harvard University alumni
People from Belmont, Massachusetts
Soccer players from Massachusetts
Sportspeople from Middlesex County, Massachusetts
Harvard Crimson men's soccer players
FC Boston players
FC Bulleen Lions players
Kingston City FC players
Memphis 901 FC players
Forward Madison FC players
USL Championship players
USL League One players
USL League Two players
League of Ireland players
Expatriate association footballers in Ireland
American expatriate soccer players
American expatriate sportspeople in Ireland
American expatriate sportspeople in Australia
Expatriate soccer players in Australia
Association football forwards